Alexey Yurevich Poltoranin (born April 29, 1987) is a Kazakh cross-country skier who has competed at the international senior level since 2004. He has three World Cup wins, one in 2010 and two in 2013. In the 2013 World Championship in Val di Fiemme he won two bronze medals. Most of his best results are in the classic technique.

At the FIS Nordic World Ski Championships 2019 Poltoranin was one of five athletes caught doping by Bundeskriminalamt in a police raid in Seefeld, Austria. He was arrested before the start of the 15 kilometre classical race. He admitted to using blood doping.

His wife is biathlete Olga Poltoranina.

Athletic career

World Championships and Olympics
Poltoranin competed at the 2006 and 2010 Winter Olympics, the World Ski Championships in 2007, 2009, 2011 and 2013.

Poltoranin finished fifth in both the individual and team sprint at the 2010 Winter Olympics in Vancouver.

In the 2013 World Championship in Val di Fiemme, Poltoranin won two bronze medals. On the first day, Poltoranin competed in the classic sprint where he qualified to the semifinals, but he broke his ski poles at the start. On the next day, Alexey Poltoranin and Nikolay Chebotko won bronze at the men's team sprint. On the last day of the championship, he took bronze in the men's 50 km classic and finished after Johan Olsson and Dario Cologna. His other World Championship results include sixth in the team sprint in 2011 and seventh places at the 4×10 km relay in 2007 and the team sprint in 2009.

World Cup

The 2004/05 season was Alexey Poltoranin's first in the World Cup. First World Cup stage, where he competed, was 4 × 10 km relay in Gällivare in 2004, however he competed only in two races this season. Poltoranin claimed his first World Cup victory at the 15 kilometer classic race at Davos in 2010 and took that victory ahead of Alexander Legkov and Lukáš Bauer. For Kazakhstan, the victory of Poltoranin was the first win since March 1998 when Vladimir Smirnov won the 30 km in Lahti. In the 2011–12 season, he made only one victory, when he won Nordic Opening's 15 km classical handicap in Kuusamo. On December 17, 2011, he placed third at 15 kilometer classic in Rogla.

The 2013–14 season was more successful for Poltoranin, than previous years. He began his world cup run on November 11, 2012, in Gällivare, where he reached his first season podium finishing second in 15 km freestyle race. On December 2, 2012, he took third at Nordic Opening's 15 km classical handicap start in Kuusamo crossing the line 3.4 seconds behind Petter Northug. He finished Nordic Opening 3rd overall. Poltoranin won his first ever Tour de Ski stage in the 5 km classic individual in Toblach as Petter Northug finished second to maintain his overall lead. He also won stage 6 in Val di Fiemme and finished 11th overall in general classification. On January 19, 2013, Poltoranin won the men's 15-kilometre classical-style mass start race in a sprint finish, clocking 37 minutes, 11.6 seconds to beat Russia's Alexander Bessmertnykh by .01 seconds. On February 6, 2013, he won 1.5 k classic sprint in Davos. In the final run in Poltoranin coasted in comfortably with a time of 3:25.7, while Cologna narrowly out-sprinted Pellegrino for a second-place finish to please the home crowd. This was Poltoranin's first sprint victory on the World Cup. He placed second in last two stages of the season in Lahti and Drammen, where in both races was defeated by Petter Northug. Poltoranin finished 2012–13 World Cup season 4th overall with 995 points.

Cross-country skiing results
All results are sourced from the International Ski Federation (FIS).

Olympic Games

World Championships
 2 medals – (2 bronze)

World Cup

Season standings

Individual podiums
11 victories – (4 , 7 ) 
27 podiums – (14 , 13 )

Team podiums

 1 podium – (1 )

Other career highlights
Asian Winter Games
2007 –  Changchun  2nd, freestyle sprint
2011 –  Almaty  1st, classical sprint
2011 –  Almaty  1st, team freestyle sprint (with Chebotko)
2011 –  Almaty  3rd, 10 km classical individual
2011 –  Almaty  1st, 30 km classical mass start
2011 –  Almaty  1st, 4 × 10 km relay (with Cherepanov / Chebotko / Velichko)

See also
FIS Nordic World Ski Championships 2013

References

External links

 
 
 
  Alexey Poltoranin at the Fischersports

1987 births
Cross-country skiers at the 2006 Winter Olympics
Cross-country skiers at the 2010 Winter Olympics
Cross-country skiers at the 2014 Winter Olympics
Cross-country skiers at the 2018 Winter Olympics
FIS Nordic World Ski Championships medalists in cross-country skiing
Kazakhstani male cross-country skiers
Kazakhstani sportspeople in doping cases
Living people
Olympic cross-country skiers of Kazakhstan
Doping cases in cross-country skiing
People from Ridder, Kazakhstan
Cross-country skiers at the 2007 Asian Winter Games
Cross-country skiers at the 2011 Asian Winter Games
Asian Games medalists in cross-country skiing
Asian Games gold medalists for Kazakhstan
Asian Games silver medalists for Kazakhstan
Asian Games bronze medalists for Kazakhstan
Tour de Ski skiers
Medalists at the 2007 Asian Winter Games
Medalists at the 2011 Asian Winter Games
21st-century Kazakhstani people